L1 Energy is an oil and gas investment company controlled by the Russian billionaire Mikhail Fridman, through Alfa Group, and chaired by Lord Browne.

On 2 March 2015, it was announced that Lord Browne was the executive chairman, and would be renouncing his other roles to build a major new oil and gas company from scratch.

L1 Energy will run DEA AG, the purchase of which was announced in March 2014 that DEA for €5.1 billion. L1 Energy will seek to build a global oil and gas company through the acquisition of platforms in Europe, North America and South East Asia.

Advisory board
As of August 2017:
Lord Browne, former CEO of BP
Tony Hayward, chairman of Glencore
Stan Polovets
Andrew Gould, former chairman of BG Group
Charles Goodyear, former CEO, BHP
Scott D. Sheffield, executive chairman and former CEO of Pioneer Natural Resources

References

Companies based in London
Oil companies of Russia
Energy companies established in 2015
Non-renewable resource companies established in 2015
2015 establishments in England